Agni Samskaram is a Telugu film starring Chiranjeevi, Kavitha and Subhashini. 

Chiranjeevi

Madhavi

Soundtrack

References

External links
 

1980 films
1980s Telugu-language films